Basileuterus is a genus of New World warblers, best represented in Central and South America. This is one of only two warbler genera that are well represented in the latter continent. Some species formerly considered in this genus are now placed in the genus Myiothlypis.  It is likely that the ancestors of this genus colonised South America from the family's heartland in northern Central America even before the two continents were linked, and subsequent speciation provided most of the resident warbler species of that region.

These are mainly robust warblers with a stout bill. The majority of species have olive or grey upperparts and yellow underparts. The head is often strikingly marked with a long broad supercilium, a coloured crown or crown stripes, and often other striking head markings.

Many species are not well-studied, but those for which the breeding habits are known all build a domed nest on a bank or on the ground, so this is presumably typical of the genus as a whole.

Taxonomy
Formerly, the two members of the genus Phaeothlypis were sometimes included in Basileuterus.

Species

 Gray-headed warbler, Basileuterus griseiceps
 Golden-crowned warbler, Basileuterus culicivorus
 White-bellied warbler, Basileuterus culicivorus hypoleucus
 Three-banded warbler, Basileuterus trifasciatus
 Rufous-capped warbler, Basileuterus rufifrons
 Chestnut-capped warbler, Basileuterus delattrii
 Golden-browed warbler, Basileuterus belli
 Black-cheeked warbler, Basileuterus melanogenys
 Pirre warbler, Basileuterus ignotus
 Three-striped warbler, Basileuterus tristriatus
 Yungas warbler, Basileuterus punctipectus
 Black-eared warbler, Basileuterus melanotis
 Tacarcuna warbler, Basileuterus tacarcunae
 Fan-tailed warbler, Basileuterus lachrymosus

References
 Curson, Quinn and Beadle, New World Warblers 
 Stiles and Skutch,  A Guide to the Birds of Costa Rica

External links
Basileuterus videos, photos and sounds on the Internet Bird Collection

 
Parulidae
Bird genera
Higher-level bird taxa restricted to the Neotropics